State Theatre is a historic theater building in Plant City, Florida. It is located at 111 W. J. Arden Mays Boulevard. The theater opened in 1939, closed in the 1950s and was then used as an antique and collectibles store (State Theatre Antiques). The pink building with blue trim is an example of art deco architecture.

References

Theatres in Florida
Plant City, Florida
Theatres completed in 1939
1939 establishments in Florida
Buildings and structures in Hillsborough County, Florida